The 1904 United States presidential election in Ohio was held on November 8, 1904, as part of the 1904 United States presidential election. State voters chose 23 electors to the Electoral College, who voted for president and vice president.

Ohio was decisively won the Republican Party candidate, incumbent President Theodore Roosevelt, with 59.75% of the popular vote. The Democratic Party candidate, Alton B. Parker, garnered a meager 34.32% of the popular vote.

Results

Results by county

See also
 United States presidential elections in Ohio

References

Ohio
1904
1904 Ohio elections